Alexander Sergeyevich Taneyev (also transliterated as Taneiev, Tanaiev, Taneieff, and Taneyeff in English; January 17, 1850, Saint Petersburg – February 7, 1918, Petrograd) was a Russian state official and composer of the late Romantic era, specifically of the nationalist school. Among his better-known works were three string quartets, believed to have been composed between 1898–1900.

Alexander Taneyev is not well known outside Russia. His name is often confused with that of his distant cousin Sergei Taneyev (1856–1915).

A member of Russian aristocracy, Taneyev was a high-ranking state official, serving for 22 years as the head of His Imperial Majesty's Own Chancellery. His daughter Anna Vyrubova was a lady in waiting and best friend of Tsarina Alexandra. Vyrubova is best known for her friendship with the Romanov family and with the starets Grigori Rasputin.

Background
Alexander Taneyev inherited an enthusiasm for music from his parents. He was dissuaded from pursuing a career as a musician due to his position in the Russian upper class. After studying at university, he entered the Russian civil service, succeeding his father as Director of the Imperial Chancellery.  After 1900 he was the head of the folksong collection project of the Russian Geographical Society. Several of the songs collected during this period were later arranged and published by Anatoly Lyadov.

Taneyev pursued musical studies in Germany and later in Petersburg, where he became a student of Nikolai Rimsky-Korsakov.  Taneyev's situation at this time bore similarities to that of fellow composer Alexander Borodin. Both were composers whose main occupation was not in music (Borodin was a chemistry professor; Taneyev held a bureaucratic post). It was rumored that Taneyev kept a score that he was working on hidden beneath official documents so that he might pen a few notes between appointments.

Taneyev's compositional output was large: two operas, four symphonies, several pieces for orchestra, numerous choral works, and a considerable amount of chamber music including three string quartets. The influence on his work of the other Russian composers, such as Rimsky-Korsakov, Balakirev and Lyadov, is often noted.

Selected works

Opera
 Cupid's Revenge (Месть Амура), opera, Op. 13 (1899); libretto by Tatyana Lvovna Shchepkina-Kupernik
 The Blizzard (Метель), opera in 2 acts, 4 scenes (1914); libretto by V. Svetlov after poems of D. Tsertelev

Orchestral
 Suite No. 1, Op. 9
 Festive March (Торжественный марш), Op. 12
 Suite No. 2 in F major, Op. 14
 Theme with Variations
 Menuetto. Tranquillo
 Andantino
 Finale. Allegro con spirito
 Symphony No. 2 in B minor, Op. 21 (1903)
 Andante - Allegro
 Scherzo
 Adagio mosso
 Finale. Allegro vivacissimo
 Hamlet, Overture, Op. 31 (pub. 1906)

Concertante
 Rêverie for violin and orchestra, Op. 23

Chamber music
 Petite valse for violin and piano
 Bagatelle and Serenade for cello and piano, Op.10
 Arabesque for clarinet and piano, Op. 24
 String Quartet No. 1 in G major, Op. 25
 String Quartet No. 2 in C major, Op. 28
 String Quartet No. 3 in A major, Op. 30
 Album Leaf (Листок из альбома) in G major for viola and piano, Op. 33

Piano
 Valse-caprice in A major
 Valse-caprice in D major
 Mazurka No. 1, Op. 15
 Mazurka No. 3 "Souvenir de Bade", Op. 20
 Bluette, Op. 22

Personal life 
Taneyev married Nadezhda Illarionovna Tolstoy (1860-1937). They had three children: Anna Vyrubova (1884-1964); Sergei Alexandrovich (1886-1975); and Alexandra Alexandrovna (1888-1968), who married Alexander Erikovich von Pistohlkors, the stepson of Grand Duke Paul Alexandrovich of Russia.

Notes

References
 Edward Garden: "Aleksandr Taneyev", Grove Music Online ed. L. Macy (Accessed May 21, 2005), (subscription access)
 Some of the information in this article appears on the website of Edition Silvertrust but permission to use this text under the GNU Free Documentation License has been given, and this documentation provided to Wikipedia.

External links
 Alexander Taneyev String Quartet Nos.1, 2 & 3 Soundbites and discussion or works.
 

1850 births
1918 deaths
19th-century classical composers
20th-century classical composers
Honorary members of the Saint Petersburg Academy of Sciences
Russian Romantic composers
Russian male classical composers
Russian opera composers
Male opera composers
20th-century Russian male musicians
19th-century male musicians